Allison Ahlfeldt (born )  is an American Paralympic volleyball player.
She studied at University of California-Irvine.

Competition
In 2000, she played with the Men's team, but was excluded from international competition.
In 2004, she participated in 2004 Paralympic Games which were held in Athens, Greece and where she won a bronze medal.

References

External links

Paralympic volleyball players of the United States
Paralympic bronze medalists for the United States
Living people
1978 births
Medalists at the 2004 Summer Paralympics
Volleyball players at the 2004 Summer Paralympics
American women's volleyball players
Year of birth uncertain
People from Costa Mesa, California
Sportspeople from Orange County, California
University of California, Irvine alumni
Paralympic medalists in volleyball
21st-century American women